Noise Chaos War is a compilation album by American thrash metal band Hirax. It contains three EPs in remastered format; Barrage of Noise (2000), Chaos and Brutality, and Assassins of War (2007). The song "Bombs of Death" is a live recorded video from a 2009 show in Japan.

Track listing 
Barrage of Noise EP

Chaos and Brutality EP

Assassins of War EP

References 

Hirax albums
Thrash metal compilation albums
2010 compilation albums